Agustín Ignacio Orión (born 26 June 1981) is an Argentine former professional footballer who played as a goalkeeper. He was capped three times for Argentina.

Club career

Orion was San Lorenzo's first choice goalkeeper in 2007, when he helped the club to win the Clausura tournament.

On 9 December 2009, the goalkeeper left San Lorenzo for 500 thousand euros and joined Estudiantes de La Plata.

In July 2011 Orion signed with Boca Juniors, where he won the 2011 Apertura. In 2013, Agustín received offers from important European clubs, but he decided to stay in Boca Juniors, because he is an important piece in the team and he loves the club.

In August 2016 Orion signed with Racing Club.

International career
Orion was called up to the Argentina national football team as third goalkeeper behind Roberto Abbondanzieri and Juan Pablo Carrizo for the 2007 Copa América held in Venezuela.

He made his debut for the Albiceleste against Brazil in the Superclásico de las Américas in September 2011.

In June 2014, Orion was named in Argentina's squad for the 2014 FIFA World Cup.

International appearances

Honours

Club
San Lorenzo
 Primera División: 2007 Clausura

Estudiantes de La Plata
 Primera División: 2010 Apertura

Boca Juniors
 Primera División: 2011 Apertura, 2015 Argentine Primera División
 Copa Argentina: 2011–12, 2015

Colo-Colo
 Primera División: Transición 2017
 Supercopa de Chile: 2017 Supercopa de Chile, 2018 Supercopa de Chile

International
Argentina
FIFA World Cup runner-up: 2014
Copa America runner-up: 2007

Individual
Ubaldo Fillol Award: 2011 Apertura (with Boca Juniors)

References

External links

 Argentine Primera statistics at Fútbol XXI 
 
 

1981 births
Living people
People from Ramos Mejía
Association football goalkeepers
Argentine footballers
Argentine people of Spanish descent
Argentina international footballers
2007 Copa América players
2014 FIFA World Cup players
Argentine Primera División players
San Lorenzo de Almagro footballers
Estudiantes de La Plata footballers
Boca Juniors footballers
Racing Club de Avellaneda footballers
Colo-Colo footballers
Chilean Primera División players
Expatriate footballers in Chile
Sportspeople from Buenos Aires Province